Vice Admiral Kaleem Shaukat  is a former Pakistani naval officer and vice admiral in the Pakistan Navy, served as the vice chief of naval staff from 2017 to November 2019. Kaleem retired from the naval uniform service in 2019 after succeeding Fayyaz Gilani as VCNS. He is presently serving as Rector Bahria University .

Biography

Kaleem Shaukat joined the Pakistan Navy in 1980, and was directed to attend the Britannia Royal Naval College in England where he did his initial military training  as a surface officer and passed out in 1982. He gained commissioned as Sub-Lieutenant and served as an executive officer in the surface warship.

He is a graduate of the National Defence University in Islamabad, and Armed Forces College in Turkey. Capt. Shaukat served as a commanding officer while commanding the Tariq-class warships in 2000s. In addition, he also served in the faculty of Naval War College in Lahore, and commanded the 25th Destroyer Squadron.

In 2009, Cdre. Shaukat took the command of the Punjab Command, and was conferred with a gallantry award for his services. His career in the Navy is mostly served in the Middle East, having commanding the Pakistan Armed Forces-Middle East based in Qatar in 2010-12.

In 2012, Cdre. Shaukat was promoted to the two-star rank admiral, and took over the command of the CTF 151. At the Navy NHQ, he other command appointment included his role as DCNS (Projects), and Director of Naval Warfare Directorate.

On March 2, 2017, R-Adm. took over the command of the Pakistan Fleet from Vice-Admiral S.A. Hussaini, and was eventually promoted to the three-star rank.

In October 2017, V-Adm. Shaukat was moved at the Navy NHQ, and was appointed as the DCNS (Operations) before elevated as the Vice-Chief of Naval Staff on 3 December 2017.

On 16 November 2019, Vice-Admiral Kaleem Shaukat retired from his military service, completing his 39-year of military service with the Navy, and was succeeded by Vice-Admiral Fayyaz Gilani as vice naval chief.

Awards and decorations

See also
Pakistan Navy

References

External links

Living people
People from Karachi
Sindhi people
Pakistan Naval Academy alumni
Graduates of Britannia Royal Naval College
National Defence University, Pakistan alumni
Pakistani expatriates in Turkey
Pakistan Navy admirals
Recipients of Hilal-i-Imtiaz
Recipients of Sitara-i-Imtiaz
Piracy in Somalia
Year of birth missing (living people)